Walter Gómez (25 March 1953 – 30 March 2015) was an Argentine boxer. He competed in the men's light welterweight event at the 1972 Summer Olympics.

References

1953 births
2015 deaths
Argentine male boxers
Olympic boxers of Argentina
Boxers at the 1972 Summer Olympics
People from La Pampa Province
Light-welterweight boxers